The Naughtiest Girl in the School is the first novel in The Naughtiest Girl series by Enid Blyton, published in 1940. The title character is Elizabeth Allen, a spoiled girl who is sent to a boarding school called Whyteleafe School.

Plot
Elizabeth Allen is a spoiled girl who is an only child. She becomes very upset and outraged when she learns that she is being sent to a boarding school. When Elizabeth joins Whyteleafe School she is determined to misbehave so that she will be expelled and able to go back home as soon as possible. She is surprised to find that the children run the school through weekly community meetings, and that her behaviour will be judged by her peers. It is a portrayal of children's restorative justice, and is based on A. S. Neill's school, Summerhill.

Main characters

Elizabeth Allen
Elizabeth Allen is a pretty girl with dark curly hair and blue eyes. All her life she had done as she liked and been spoiled by her family. She also hates school. Six governesses had come and gone, but not one of them had been able to make Elizabeth obedient or good mannered. All the governesses failed; no one got success and she is almost 11 years old. She does not like other boys and girls. They were shocked at her mischief and rude ways. Her governess, Miss Scott, describes her trouble:

Joan Townsend 
Completely unlike Elizabeth, Joan Townsend is gentle, timid, shy and nervous of confronting people or speaking in public.  She was a red-haired girl with freckles who is timid because she was left in the background by her parents, who had another child, a boy called Michael who died when he was young. Due to his death, Joan's parents didn't think about it much.  Although timid, Joan is not weak or silly; later in the series she is found to be an extremely mature and understanding girl. She becomes a calm girl that is sensitive for doing the right thing. She is Elizabeth's best friend and her first friend was Elizabeth.

Nora O'Sullivan 
Nora O'Sullivan, a monitor at Whyteleafe school, is a girl who upholds its traditions. She is very responsible, jolly and sensible, but does not look below the surface. Elizabeth gets into a lot of trouble with the sometimes unreasonable and strict monitor. Nora looks after the girls in dormitory 6 including Elizabeth, Joan, Ruth, Belinda and Helen. Nora is a strict but fair girl and hates it if the school's traditions are disobeyed. She is Irish.

William and Rita
William and Rita are the head children at Whyteleafe School. They are very understanding and kind and firm in a way. They are well known and highly appreciated around the school. they are the judges at the school meetings and they are also looked up at by almost all the students.

Richard
Richard is a sensitive boy who is brilliant at music. Once Richard and Elizabeth used to be enemies but becomes one of Elizabeth's best friends. he also plays a duet with Elizabeth at the end of term concert and whispers to Elizabeth "you're a good sort!" when Elizabeth decides to stay on at Whyteleafe School.

Harry Dunn
Although Harry Dunn is introduced as a sly-faced boy and a cheat. His behaviour was dealt with and cured by the Meeting. His relationship with Elizabeth started out badly, with Elizabeth paying a nasty trick on him, slapping him and calling him a cheat when he was not one anymore. But he was a kind and generous boy and would do anything to make Elizabeth forget about their fight.

John Terry
Like Richard, John Terry is also a one sided boy, devoted to gardening and little else. Elizabeth and John have a very good relationship early in the book. John is fond of gardening, due to his and Elizabeth′s common interest in gardening, they become good friends, Elizabeth helping John with his gardening.

Michael Townsend
Michael was Joan's twin brother who died from an illness while Joan survived. As a result, Joan's parents ignored her until Elizabeth's actions instigated a meeting and Joan's mother told Joan the truth at Whyteleafe. Michael was described as "bonny and laughing" while Joan was described as "sulky and selfish" and Joan's parents couldn't help loving him more as they always wanted a boy and didn't care much for girls.

Ms Belle and Ms Best
Ms Belle and Ms Best are the joints headmistresses of Whyteleafe School. They are referred to as "The Beauty and the Beast", a name intended to be rude by Elizabeth but stuck. While they leave it to the children at the meetings, they can be called for help by the head boy and girl.

References

External links
Enid Blyton Society page

Novels by Enid Blyton
1940 British novels
Novels set in boarding schools
1940 children's books
George Newnes Ltd books